Lily Chakravarty is an Indian actress. She worked in many Bengali and Hindi films.

Early life
She was born in Dhaka. She was born to Sri Kesab Chandra Chakraborty and Dipti Chakraborty.

Career
Lily debuted in the Bengali movie Bhanu Pelo Lottery in 1958 where she acted in the role of Maya, a typist. Lily, in her long career, acted in many notable films, and sharing screen with her powerful appearance. She shared the Best Supporting Actress award for her role in the film Sanjhbati with Sudiptaa Chakraborty, who won it for her role in Jyesthoputro, in the West Bengal Film Journalist Association Award 2020.

Filmography

Web series

References

External links
 

 

Living people
People from Dhaka
Indian film actresses
Actresses in Bengali cinema
Actresses in Hindi cinema
Bengali Hindus
Indian Hindus
Actresses in Malayalam cinema
Year of birth missing (living people)